Eluza (or Iluza) is an ancient city in the late Roman province of Phrygia Pacatiana Prima, Asia Minor. 

Its site is at modern Acemlar or Hacimlar, Turkey.

Ecclesiastical history 
Eluza was a suffragan of Laodicea in Phrygia.

The diocese was nominally restored in 1933 as Latin titular bishopric of Eluza (Latin = Curiate Italian), Latin adjective Eluzan (US).

Sources and references 
 GCatholic - data for all sections

Catholic titular sees in Asia